is a Japanese record label and a division of Polystar, the parent company of Trattoria Records.

It also serves as an IFPI member.

See also
 List of record labels
 Trattoria Records

References
 Pryaid Records
 IFPI
 Polystar

IFPI members
Japanese record labels
Record labels established in 1998